His Majesty's Dockyard Sydney, also known as Kings Dockyard, was built in 1797 on the western shore of Sydney Cove, under orders by Governor John Hunter. In 1833 the dockyard was closed down.

Master Shipwright
Thomas Moore 1797-1809
William Cossar 1812-1821
John Nicholson 1821-1833

Notable ships built or repaired
Integrity, schooner launched in 1804, the first vessel to be built and launched from the Dockyard.
, repairs undertaken to the American seal fur trading vessel.
Tom Thumb, built in 1796 for the 1796 expedition by George Bass and Matthew Flinders.
, repaired.
, repaired.
Francis, repaired.
Norfolk, repaired.
Bee, repaired.
Elizabeth Henrietta, laid down in 1801 as Portland and launched in 1816.
, schooner launched in 1803.

References

End of Argyle Street - Historical land viewer - St Philip 

Shipyards of New South Wales